Bárbara Sepúlveda Hales (born 19 June 1985) is a Chilean politician who was elected as a member of the Chilean Constitutional Convention. She is a member of the Communist Party of Chile.

She was founder of «Abofem» (Feminist Lawyers).

References

External links
 

Living people
1985 births
Chilean politicians
People from Santiago
21st-century Chilean politicians
Communist Party of Chile politicians
University of Chile alumni
Alumni of the London School of Economics
Members of the Chilean Constitutional Convention